The second season of iCarly aired on Nickelodeon from September 27, 2008 to August 8, 2009. The season continues the stories of Carly Shay (Miranda Cosgrove), Sam Puckett (Jennette McCurdy), and Freddie Benson (Nathan Kress) as they produce their own web show called "iCarly." Jerry Trainor co-stars as Carly's big brother Spencer. This season is the first to have a major plot twist, as it sees Sam and Freddie sharing their first kiss, just to avoid the frustration of not having a first kiss. This is followed by them becoming somewhat closer. This season contained the special "iChristmas". The second season consisted of 45 episodes, with 25 of them airing as part of the second season before the remaining 20 were marketed as the third season. This season has specials "iGo to Japan", "iChristmas", "iKiss", "iReunite with Missy", "iMake Sam Girlier", "iDate a Bad Boy", and "iFight Shelby Marx"

Cast

Main cast

 Miranda Cosgrove as Carly Shay
 Jennette McCurdy as Sam Puckett (and as Melanie Puckett in "iTwins")
 Nathan Kress as Freddie Benson
 Jerry Trainor as Spencer Shay

Recurring cast

 Noah Munck as Gibby Gibson
 Mary Ann Springer as Wendy
 Mary Scheer as Marissa Benson
BooG!e as T-Bo
 Reed Alexander as Nevel Papperman
 Jeremy Rowley as Lewbert
 Ryan Ochoa as Chuck Chambers
David St. James as Mr. Howard
 Drew Roy as Griffin
 Tim Russ as Principal Ted Franklin

Guest stars
 Lucas Cruikshank as Fred Figglehorn and himself ("iMeet Fred")
 James Maslow as Shane ("iSaw Him First")
 Aria Wallace as Mandy Valdez ("iWant My Website Back")
 Good Charlotte as themselves ("iGo to Japan")
 David Archuleta as himself ("iRocked the Vote")
 Haley Ramm as Missy Robinson ("iReunite with Missy")
 Alex Schemmer as Wade Collins ("iRocked the Vote")
 Victoria Justice as Shelby Marx ("iFight Shelby Marx")

Episodes

References

2008 American television seasons
2009 American television seasons
2